Parepilysta is a genus of beetles in the family Cerambycidae, containing the following species:

subgenus Fasciatepilysta
 Parepilysta subfasciata (Schwarzer, 1931)

subgenus Granosepilysta
 Parepilysta basigranosa (Schwarzer, 1931)

subgenus Parepilysta
 Parepilysta granulipennis (Breuning, 1939)
 Parepilysta granulosa Breuning, 1939
 Parepilysta strandi Breuning, 1939
 Parepilysta woodlarkiana Breuning, 1976

subgenus Spinepilysta

 Parepilysta borneana Breuning, 1961
 Parepilysta enganensis Breuning, 1970
 Parepilysta luzonica Breuning, 1956
 Parepilysta mindoroensis Breuning, 1947
 Parepilysta ochreoguttata Breuning, 1961
 Parepilysta papuana Breuning, 1956
 Parepilysta sedlaceki Breuning, 1976

subgenus Striatepilysta
 Parepilysta striatipennis Breuning, 1949

References

Apomecynini
Taxa named by Stephan von Breuning (entomologist)